The Udmurts are a Permian (Finnic) ethnic group in Eastern Europe, who speak the Udmurt language.

Etymology
The name Udmurt comes from * 'meadow people,' where the first part represents the Permic root * 'meadow, glade, turf, greenery', and the second part, murt means 'person' (cf. Komi , Mari ), probably an early borrowing from an Iranian language (such as Scythian): * or * 'person, man' (cf. Persian ), which is thought to have been borrowed from the Indo-Aryan term * 'man', literally 'mortal, one who is bound to die' (< PIE  'to die'), compare Old Indic  'young warrior' and Old Indic  'chariot warrior', both connected specifically with horses and chariots. This is supported by a document dated 1557, in which the Udmurts are referred to as lugovye lyudi 'meadow people', alongside the traditional Russian name .

On the other hand, in the Russian tradition, the name 'meadow people' refers to the inhabitants of the left bank of river in general. Recently, the most relevant is the version of V. V. Napolskikh and S. K. Belykh. They suppose that ethnonym was borrowed from the Iranian entirely:  'resident of outskirts, border zone' (cf. Antes) → Proto-Permic * → Udmurt .

Distribution
Most Udmurt people live in Udmurtia. Small groups live in the neighboring areas of Kirov Oblast and Perm Krai of Russia, Bashkortostan, Tatarstan, and Mari El.

The Udmurt population is shrinking; the Russian Census reported 552,299 in 2010, down from the 2002 Russian census figure of 637,000, in turn down from 746,562 in 1989.
 The 2010 census counted fewer Udmurts than had the 1939 census.

Culture

The Udmurt language belongs to the Uralic family.

The Udmurts have a national epic called Dorvyzhy.

A chapter in the French  from 1776 is devoted to the description of the Wotyak people.
James George Frazer also mentions a rite performed by the people in his book The Golden Bough.

Many Udmurt people have red hair, and a festival to celebrate the red-haired people has been held annually in Izhevsk since 2004.

The Udmurts used to be semi-nomadic forest dwellers that lived in riverside communities. However, most Udmurts now live in towns. Although the clan-based social structure of the Udmurts no longer exists, its traces are still strong and it continues to shape modern Udmurt culture.

See also 

 Besermyan (considered a subgroup of the Udmurts)

References

Further reading
 . "Сто сказок удмуртского народа" [A hundred fairy tales from the Udmurt people]. Ижевск: Удмуртское книжное издательство, 1961.
 . "III. Forschungsberichte: Die  Volkserzählungen  der Wotjaken (Udmurten) (Mit Beiträgen  von Walter  Anderson)". In: Fabula 5, no. Jahresband (1962): 101-155. https://doi.org/10.1515/fabl.1962.5.1.101
 Shushakova, Galina. "The Idea of Earthly and Unearthly worlds in the Udmurt fairy-tales". In: Folk Belief Today. Edited by Mare Kõiva and Kai Vassiljeva. Tartu: Estonian Academy of Sciences; Institute of Estonian Language; Estonian Museum of Literature, 1995. pp. 442-446. .

External links
Udmurtology—, a site devoted to the Udmurt language and online resources.
Udmurt language Wikipedia

 
Permians
Ethnic groups in Russia
History of Ural
History of Udmurtia
Indigenous peoples of Europe
Indigenous peoples of Russia
People from Udmurtia